This is a list of wars involving the Kingdom of Scotland before the creation of the Kingdom of Great Britain by the Acts of Union 1707, including clan conflicts, civil wars, and rebellions. For dates after 1708, see List of wars involving the United Kingdom.

10th and 11th centuries

12th century

13th century

14th century

15th century

16th century

17th century

See also
 List of wars in Great Britain
 Military history of Scotland
 List of wars involving the United Kingdom

 
Scotland
Wars

Wars Scotland